Jalaa Sporting Club, previously known as Jeunesse Sportivo Alep is a multi-sports club based in the Syrian city of Aleppo. They are most notable with their football and basketball branches. The club was founded in 1949. The football teem is currently playing in the Syrian League 3rd Division. They play their home games at the 7 April Stadium.

References

Football clubs in Syria
Association football clubs established in 1949
Sport in Aleppo
1949 establishments in Syria